is a fictional character in Arc System Works's Guilty Gear video game series. In the series, he is a doctor who becomes a murderer after the death of a girl in one of his surgeries. After killing scores of people and being imprisoned, Faust is given a second chance after the first tournament. He decides to commit suicide, but he learns the girl's death was actually caused by a third party. Donning a bag on his head and taking his oversized scalpel, Faust seeks out the truth about the girl's death while dedicating himself to saving lives again.

His unpaired appearance and personality has led to different commentaries by video game reviewers; while a reviewer described him as "iconic", another critic called Faust "goofy". Faust was also noted to be a good fighting game character while his moves received both praise and criticism.

Appearances
Faust is introduced in the series' first and homonymous installment of Guilty Gear, where he is a renowned physician. One day, a girl comes under his care that needs an unauthorized, experimental surgery, one that was denied repeatedly. In actuality, the procedure was denied because it held the secret to resurrection, which the Conclave would use in order to resurrect Justice. In the process, the Conclave had someone hire the assassin Zato-ONE, who would sabotage the surgery and cause the death of Faust's patient. Faust blames himself and, consumed by guilt, becomes insane and turns himself into a serial killer named Dr. Baldhead. After killing many people, he is arrested. However, he is allowed to enter in a tournament to kill more people unknowingly for Justice's resurrection. After it, he decides to atone for his crimes by committing suicide but he receives a visit from the ghost of the dead girl who tells him that her death is not his fault. Then, he abandons his Baldhead persona, assumes his real name, puts a paper bag on his head, and dedicates himself to saving as many lives as he can while he tries to find out the truth about the girl's death.

In Guilty Gear X (2000), while Faust is trying to help people and fulfilling his duties as a doctor, he meets with Dizzy and persuades her to abandon her life in the forest to prevent further attacks on her. In another possible ending, he heals Zato-1 from his illness, and leaves him under the care of his right hand Venom. In Guilty Gear X2 (2002), he wants to pursue I-No since he knows she could cause people harm. This game features three possible endings for Faust: he finds I-No but she confronts him with his past, and he admits that he still enjoys causing pain, yet vows to continue in his duty as a doctor; he meets Zappa, a man with spirits in his body, and he does not know how to help him; and in a fight alongside Venom against several Robo-Kys, he discovers that the Assassin's Guild participated in the death of the young girl he thought he killed. In Guilty Gear XX Accent Core Plus (2008), Faust's storyline revolves around his attempt to find a cure for Zappa's condition. Depending on the player's decision, he can discover a cure and perform surgery on Zappa.

In Guilty Gear Xrd (2014), Faust confronted the resurrected Zato-1, who revealed that he was framed for his malpractice incident by the Conclave because his procedure held the secret of resurrection. The Conclave needed to keep this technique hidden, which is why they hired Zato-1 to kill Faust's patient. Later, Faust is found by Johnny, who revealed that May was having a severe headache and that she was Japanese. He provided May with medicine for the pain, but they were then attacked by Bedman. Faust and the Jellyfish Pirates were able to escape when Chipp Zanuff distracted the assassin. After helping Sol in stopping Justice's revival, Faust confronted Chronus of the Conclave and discovered that they were merely manipulated by someone with a higher authority. Faust and Chronus eventually goes on journey together to investigate the true culprit's next plot, while on the run from the second Illyrian King Leo Whitefang. Upon discovering Ariels is behind all the tragic events, Faust snuck into Illyrian library where he reunite with Zappa at a same time how Japanese related to the existence of “Antimatter” Gears. He creates serums of a cure to negate “Antimatter” Gears deployed by Ariels from becoming suicidal time-bombs and destroy the world.

Faust’s playable appearance Guilty Gear Strive (2021) eventually explains in one of the side-stories of the game, after Happy Chaos activated the Tir ná nOg mode of the White House, and Third Illyrian King Daryl convinced Chaos to release him and other hostage worlds’ leaders, barring US President Vernon, who alongside Giovanna are involved with Sol and Gear Maker Asuka R. Kreutz, including Potemkin on protecting the Tome of Origin from falling to Chaos’ hand. It is revealed that Faust is helping Sin, Ramlethal, Baiken and May on stopping Bedman’s sister, Delilah from losing control of her power just to kill Chaos, despite the fallen Original’ current immortal nature. With the help of Bedman, whose soul temporarily inhabited his weaponized bed, Faust and his allies manages to cure Delilah, at cost of the doctor’s condition becomes drastically weakened, which explains his playable appearance. He is later seen in the main story epilogue under Chronus’ care while they continue their next journey sometimes after the White House incident.

Faust is also a playable character in the spin-off games Guilty Gear Petit 2 (2002), Isuka (2004), Dust Strikers (2006), and Judgment (2006).

Reception
Faust has received public and critical reception as a standout character in the Guilty Gear series due to his appearance and unconventional in-game behavior. He was voted the twelfth-most popular out of the series' 33 characters in a 2013 fan poll conducted by Arc System Works, while fans voted him 91st in a vote of the top 100 fictional doctors in a 2014 poll held by Dorkly. GamesRadar described him as "a spear equipped monkey kung-fu warrior replete with a paper bag on his head", and included Faust in their list of "gaming's maddest mad doctors", and "gaming's masked maniacs", where they remarked "his moves took on a more comedic tone" after renouncing his Baldhead persona. IGN compared him to Soul series character Voldo, adding that he "has enough humorous patterns to keep you entertained for days." Mark Smith of Game Chronicles praised the representation of Faust's personality in his moveset, which The Escapist described as "full of wild lunges and sudden extensions" in a 2010 article about "masters of drunken combat", but criticized  by NowGamer as his "fool attacks".

Johnny Liu of Game Revolution cited Faust as his favorite Guilty Gear character, declaring that he "really personifies the quirkiness" of Guilty Gear X2. Pocket Gamer described him as "one of the best creations in 2D scrap-'em-ups history." In 2010, WeDoTech.net ranked Faust as the best fighting video game character of all time, calling him "iconic, funny and possessing of one of the meanest weapons in the business" while "his bizarre moves ... without doubt make him the single best fighting character in any video game." Elton Jones of Complex ranked Faust ("a beast on the battlefield") 42nd in his 2012 selection of "The 50 Most Dominant Fighting Game Characters", and in  pitching a fantasy crossover fighting game between the Guilty Gear characters and the cast of Darkstalkers, he wrote, "All the horror movie archetypes and whatever the hell Faust is would look sweet doing battle against each other with heavy metal playing in the background."

UGO Networks ranked his "Instant Kill" finisher ("which involves medical experiments, a trap door, and a nuclear bomb") as the 36th-most gruesome finishing move in gaming history, while Complex elected it the third-coolest fighting game combo. On the other hand, he was mentioned with I-No and Millia among the series' "goofy characters" by 1UP.com. Faust's third Guilty Gear X2 ending was ranked 133rd by 4thletter.net in their 2013 selection of the top 200 fighting game endings. "It’s the closest the games have come to outright saying that [Faust and Dr. Baldhead are] the same character, as if being a 9-foot-tall doctor with a giant scalpel wasn’t enough."

See also
List of Guilty Gear characters

References

Fictional serial killers
Fictional surgeons
Guilty Gear characters
Male characters in video games
Video game characters introduced in 1998